Luxembourg for Business (LfB) is an agency of the government of Luxembourg for the promotion of trade to benefit the economy of Luxembourg.  It was founded in 2008 as an initiative by the Ministry of the Economy and Foreign Trade and the Ministry for the Middle Class, Tourism and Housing, the Chamber of Commerce, the Ducroire Office, the National Credit and Investment Corporation (SNCI), and the Luxembourg Business Federation (FEDIL).

According to its mission statement:

Footnotes

External links
 Luxembourg for Business website

Government of Luxembourg
Business in Luxembourg